Nahuel Oscar Basualdo (born 23 February 1991) is an Argentine professional footballer who plays as a right-back for Almagro.

Career
Basualdo's career began with Almagro. He made his professional debut against Brown in Primera B Metropolitana on 27 January 2013, prior to scoring his first goal in the following March during a 3–1 win over Platense. Overall, Basualdo made sixty-one appearances and scored twice in his first four seasons. In June 2015, Basualdo completed a loan move to Defensores Unidos of Primera C Metropolitana. Fifteen appearances followed. After returning to Almagro at the end of 2015, Basualdo was immediately loaned out to Primera B Metropolitana's Fénix. He scored once in seven fixtures for Fénix.

On 21 October 2016, Basualdo signed for Torneo Federal B club Atlético Uruguay on loan. His stay lasted two months, with the defender being selected on just two occasions.

Career statistics
.

References

External links

1991 births
Living people
Footballers from Buenos Aires
Argentine footballers
Association football defenders
Primera B Metropolitana players
Primera C Metropolitana players
Primera Nacional players
Club Almagro players
Defensores Unidos footballers
Club Atlético Fénix players
Atlético Uruguay players